John Ernest Vaizey, Baron Vaizey (1 October 1929 – 19 July 1984) was a British author and economist, who specialised in education.

Background and education
Vaizey was the son of Ernest Vernon Vaizey and his wife Lucy Butler Hart. He was educated at the school of Queen Mary's Hospital and went then to Queens' College, Cambridge.

Career
In 1952, he joined the United Nations Office at Geneva and after a year was elected a fellow at St Catharine's College, Cambridge. Three years later in 1956 Vaizey became a lecturer at the University of Oxford. He moved to the University of London in 1960, where he oversaw a research unit as its director for the next two years. Subsequently, Vaizey went to Worcester College, Oxford, having been appointed to its fellowship. While at Worcester College, Vaizey set up a committee to aid people arrested in Oxford for importuning, having accused the police of using agents provocateurs in policing public spaces. In 1966, he obtained the newly created professorship at the Brunel University, heading its school of social sciences from 1973. He served as an early Chief Examiner for the subject of economics for the International Baccalaureate.

Vaizey was offered the post of the vice-chancellor of the Monash University, based in Melbourne in 1975; however, after attacks by Australian artists against his close friend Bryan Robertson, who should have taken over the directorship of the National Gallery of Victoria, he declined the offer. In the 1976 Prime Minister's Resignation Honours he was designated for a life peerage and on 23 June, he was created Baron Vaizey, of Greenwich, in Greater London. In his last years Vaizey served as principal of the St Catherine's Foundation at Cumberland Lodge.

Family
In 1961, he married the author Marina Stansky, daughter of the lawyer Lyman Stansky from New York City.

One of their children is the Conservative Party politician Edward Vaizey.

Lord Vaizey died on 19 July 1984 in St Thomas' Hospital, London, following heart surgery.

Works

Arms

Notes

References

External links

1929 births
1984 deaths
Alumni of Queens' College, Cambridge
Fellows of St Catharine's College, Cambridge
Fellows of Worcester College, Oxford
Life peers
Members of the Fabian Society
20th-century British economists
Academics of Brunel University London
Labour Party (UK) life peers
Life peers created by Elizabeth II